Joe Lunati is an American drag racer and businessman. He won three National Hot Rod Association (NHRA) national titles and went on to establish the cam-grinding company, Lunati Cams, purchased by Holly Performance Holley in the mid 1990's. Lunati Cams (now Lunati Power) was sold in late 2007 to an exclusive ownership group made up of industry and racing veterans.

History 
Driving a Chevrolet-powered Devin named Trouble Maker, Lunati won three NHRA national AM/SP gasser titles.

He also took Street Eliminator at the event.

In 1965, Lunati again took the AM/SP national title, with a win at the Nationals, held at Indianapolis.

He was also Street Eliminator winner there that year.

His Camaro, The Dixie Devil, went to the final of Funny Car Eliminator at Indianapolis in 1967 (the first time the class was run there), where Lunati lost to Doug Thorley'ss "Doug's Headers" Corvair. (The Camaro was wrecked a short time later. )

Lunati also formed the cam-grinding company, Lunati Cams, purchased by Holly Performance Holley in the mid 1990's. Lunati Cams, now Lunati Power, was sold again in late 2007 to an exclusive ownership group made up of industry and racing veterans.

Notes

Sources
Davis, Larry. Gasser Wars, North Branch, MN:  Cartech, 2003, pp.184-5. 

Dragster drivers
American racing drivers
1966 in motorsport
20th-century American businesspeople
21st-century American businesspeople